Robert Kolodner is an American psychiatrist and medical informatician. In September 2006, he became the second U.S. National Coordinator for Health IT.

Career
Kolodner was chief health informatics officer at the Department of Veterans Affairs (VA) and remained on the VA staff while serving as Acting National Coordinator for Health IT.
Health and Human Services Secretary Mike Leavitt officially appointed Kolodner National Coordinator on 18 April 2007. Kolodner served as National Coordinator until David Blumenthal assumed the position on 20 April 2009.

Kolodner retired from the federal government on 23 September 2009.

References

George W. Bush administration personnel
United States Department of Health and Human Services officials
Health informaticians
20th-century American physicians
21st-century American physicians
Living people
Year of birth missing (living people)
Office of the National Coordinator for Health Information Technology
American psychiatrists
Harvard College alumni
Yale School of Medicine alumni